Hwange National Park (formerly Wankie Game Reserve) is the largest natural reserve in Zimbabwe. It is around 14,600 sq km in area. It lies in the northwest of the country, just off the main road between Bulawayo and Victoria Falls. The nearest town is Dete. Histories of the region's pre-colonial days and its development as a game reserve and National Park are available online

History of the park
Hwange National Park was founded in 1928.
It is considered for inclusion in the five-nation Kavango - Zambezi Transfrontier Conservation Area.

Poaching incidents
In 2011, nine elephants, five lions and two buffaloes were killed by poachers.

In October 2013 it was discovered that poachers killed a large number of African elephants with cyanide after poisoning their waterhole. Conservationists have claimed the incident to be the largest illegal killing of animals in Southern Africa in 25 years. Two aerial surveys were carried to determine the extent of the deaths, and 19 carcasses were identified in the first survey and a further 84 carcasses in the second survey. Three of the poachers were caught, arrested, tried, convicted and sentenced. All royal game and elephant poaching offences now have a mandatory 9-year sentence and the supply chain is also targeted.

Cecil and Xanda hunting incidents
On or about 1 July 2015, Cecil, a lion who had lived on Hwange National Park for 13 years, was killed. This action spurred widespread social media coverage and a petition calling for Zimbabwe's president Robert Mugabe to outlaw big game hunting permits. Walter Palmer, the admitted killer of Cecil, had a permit and was not charged with any crime, as all his papers were in order.  Authorities in Zimbabwe have said he is free to visit the country. Charges were initially laid against Theo Bronkhorst, Palmer's guide, for "failing to stop an illegal hunt" but these were later thrown out of court.

Two years after Cecil's killing, his son Xanda met a similar fate. Unlike that of his father, Xanda's killing was not termed illegal, though it did provoke outrage.

Biodiversity

Flora

The park is close to the edge of the Kalahari desert, a region with little water and very sparse, xerophile vegetation. The Kalahari woodland is dominated by Zambezi Teak, Sand Camwood (Baphia) and Kalahari bauhinia. Seasonal wetlands form grasslands in this area.

The north and north-west of the park are dominated by mopane woodland.

Although it has been argued that elephant populations cause change in vegetation structure, some recent studies suggest that this is not the case, even with the large increases in elephant population recorded in the late 1980s.

Fauna

The Park hosts over 100 mammal and 400 bird species, including 19 large herbivores and eight large carnivores. All Zimbabwe's specially protected animals are to be found in Hwange and it is the only protected area where gemsbok and brown hyena occur in small numbers.

Grazing herbivores are more common in the Main Camp Wild Area and Linkwasha Concession Area, with mixed feeders more common in the Robins and Sinamatella Wild Areas, which are more heavily wooded. Distribution fluctuates seasonally, with large herbivores concentrating in areas where intensive water pumping is maintained during the dry season.

The population of the Cape wild dogs to be found in Hwange is thought to be of one of the larger surviving groups in Africa today, along with that of Kruger National Park and Selous Game Reserve.

Other major predators include the lion, whose distribution and hunting in Hwange is strongly related to the pans and waterholes.
Since 2005, the protected area is considered a Lion Conservation Unit together with the Okavango Delta.

African leopard, spotted hyena and cheetah are also present in the protected area.

Elephants have been enormously successful in Hwange and the population has increased to far above that naturally supported by such an area. This population of elephants has put a lot of strain on the resources of the park. There has been a lot of debate on how to deal with this, with parks authorities implementing culling to reduce populations, especially during 1967 to 1986. The elephant population doubled in the five years following the end of culling in 1986.

National Parks Scientific Services co-ordinates two major conservation and research projects in the park:
National Leopard Project, which is surveying numbers of leopard to obtain base-line data for later comparative analysis with status of leopard in consumptive (hunting) areas and Communal Land bordering the National Park. This is carried out at Hwange in conjunction with the Wildlife Conservation and Research Unit of Oxford University and the Dete Animal Rescue Trust, a registered wildlife conservation Trust
Painted Dog Project: The project aims to protect and increase the range and numbers of African wild dog both in Zimbabwe and elsewhere in Africa, and operates through the Painted Dog Conservation organisation in Dete.

Birds 

This overview is only one indication of the diversity of birds in the park and is not a complete list.

 Yellow-billed kite
 Southern ground hornbill
 Dickinson's kestrel

 Racket-tailed roller
 Martial eagle
 Kori bustard

Black-winged stilt
Cape griffon
Pearl-spotted owlet
African hobby

Geography and geology
Most of the park is underlain by Kalahari Sands. In the north-west there are basalt lava flows of the Batoka Formation, stretching from south of Bumbusi to the Botswana border. In the north-central area, from Sinamatella going eastwards, there are granites and gneisses of the Kamativi-Dete Inlier and smaller inliers of these rocks are found within the basalts in the north-west.

The north and north-west of the park are drained by the Deka and Lukosi rivers and their tributaries, and the far south of the park is drained by the Gwabadzabuya River, a tributary of the Nata River. There are no rivers in the rest of the park, although there are fossil drainage channels in the main camp and Linkwasha areas, which form seasonal wetlands. In these areas without rivers, grassy pan depressions and pans have formed. Some of these pans, such as many of the pans in the Shumba area, fill with rainwater, while others, such as Ngweshla, Shakwanki and Nehimba, are fed by natural groundwater seeps. Many of the pans are additionally supplied by water pumped from underground by park authorities.

Archaeological, historical and cultural sites
People have lived in the region for tens of thousands of years, as attested by numerous archaeological sites ranging from early Stone Age to the historic era. Stone age foragers hunted and gathered in the region, leaving numerous sites with stone tools throughout today's park. They made engravings of animal hoofprints on sandstone rockshelter walls with some small rock paintings in the park's northwest. Iron-age people built large and small stone-walling sites in the park, such Mtoa  and the Bumbusi National Monument. Information about the people who once lived in today's park is available online.

Places of interest

Main Camp area
 Umtshibi camp, the headquarters of the park maintenance unit
 Mtoa Ruins and Pan
 Dopi vlei, a fossil river containing Dopi Pan
 Kennedy vlei, a fossil river also known as Massumamalisa, containing the Kennedy 1, Kennedy 2 (named after Sir John Noble Kennedy, Governor of Southern Rhodesia) and Massumamalisa (Somalisa) Pans
 Manga vlei, a fossil river also known as Amanga, containing the Manga Pans
 Nyamandhlovu Pan (the name refers to elephant meat) and game-viewing platform, one of the most popular game-viewing sites
 Guvalala Pan and game-viewing platform, rehabilitated by scouts from Kent, UK in the 1990s
 Dom Pan, where lion are often seen
 Chivasa Pan
 Longone Pans, named after the chief cook during the first warden's time
 Ngweshla Pan, a waterhole heavily frequented by game since before the park's proclamation
 Shapi Pan, another waterhole heavily frequented by game since before the park's proclamation and former headquarters of the park maintenance unit
 Sibaya Pan

Sinamatella area
 Chawato Springs, a mineral spring north-west of Sinamatella on the Bumbusi road
 Dabashuro (Dobashura) Spring, a mineral spring west of Sinamatella
 Salt Springs
 Tshakabika Hot Springs, a thermal spring east of Sinamatella
 Lukosi River
 Mandavu Dam and picnic site
 Masuma Dam, with a thatched shelter overlooking the dam, as well as a camping ground and picnic site
 New Inyantue Dam
 Tshompani Dam
 Dandari (Dandaro) Vlei, Plains and Pan
 Kapula Vlei
 Tiriga (Triga) Vlei, a fossil river
 Shuma Pans, a series of waterholes heavily frequented by game since before the park's proclamation, with a hide and picnic site
 Nehimba Pan
 Tshompani Pan

Linkwasha concession area
 Inkwazi Vlei, a fossil river
 Makololo Pans and Plains
 Somavundhla Pan

Dzivanini wilderness area
 Liputi (Libuti) Camp and well. The name means a meeting place
 Kordoziba Gate
 Nata River
 Gwabazabuya (Gwabadzabuya ) River
 Limpandi Dam
 Dzivanini (Sibanini) Pan and mudflats

Shakwanki wilderness area
 Shakwanki Pan; the name means ear and is a reference to its shape
 Tamasanka Pan, on the Hunters Road from Tati to Mpandamatenga
 Xixi Amabandi Pan

Tsamhole wilderness area
 Tsamhole (Tsamahole) Pan and firetower, on the edge of extensive mudflats. The name refers to a waterhole owned by two people
 Bumbumutsa Pan; the name means bumble bee
 Reedbuck vlei, at the headwaters of the Deka River

Accommodation and camping
The park has three large rest camps and four smaller permanent camps. A history of the establishment of the large camps is available online.

Main camp

This is the park headquarters, in the north-east, easily accessible by tarred road from the main Bulawayo–Victoria Falls road.

Camping and picnic sites

In addition, overnight camping is permitted at picnic sites and some of the platforms overlooking waterholes; bookings must be made in advance with the National Parks board. Camping is restricted to one party at a time and during the day, the facilities are open to all visitors. The sites are:
 Nyamandhlovu Platform
 Guvalala Platform
 Kennedy 1 Picnic Site
 Jambile Picnic Site
 Ngweshla Camp
 Shumba Camp
 Masuma Camp, a fully fenced site with two flush toilets, a shower and hide overlooking the dam
 Mandavu Dam
 Deteema Dam hide

References

External links

 Protected Planet page on Hwange 
 Zimparks Hwange Official web page 

Hwange
National parks of Zimbabwe
Matabeleland South
Tourist attractions in Matabeleland North Province
Protected areas established in 1928
1961 establishments in Southern Rhodesia
Protected areas established in 1961